The 920s decade ran from January 1, 920, to December 31, 929.

Significant people
 Al-Ash'ari
 Al-Muqtadir Abbasid caliph
 Constantine VII Byzantine emperor

References